Kokoda Memorial Hospital is a hospital located in Kokoda, Oro Province, Papua New Guinea. It was built by Rotary Australia volunteers in 1995. The building of the hospital was financed by the Government of Australia, with the Papua New Guinean government providing staff. The hospital was named for those who died in the Kokoda Campaign.

References

Hospital buildings completed in 1995
Hospitals in Papua New Guinea
Hospitals established in 1995
Kokoda